Imyannik (İmänlek) is a rural locality (a village) in Saitbabinsky Selsoviet, Gafuriysky District, Bashkortostan, Russia. The population was 98 as of 2010. There is 1 street.

Geography 
Imyannik is located 43 km north of Krasnousolsky (the district's administrative centre) by road. Yuzimyanovo is the nearest rural locality.

References 

Rural localities in Gafuriysky District